Thomas S. Cleveland (born June 8, 1960) is an American designer, illustrator and fine artist.  He served in the United States Mint's Artistic Infusion Program from 2004 until 2014.

Biography 
Cleveland was born in Oklahoma and majored in advertising and illustration and design, with fine art painting as a minor, at East Texas State University.  In 2003, Cleveland applied for the United States Mint's Artistic Infusion Program and in 2004, along with about  twelve other designers, was selected for inclusion in the program from approximately 250 applicants.

Work 
Cleveland is credited with fifteen designs for United States coins and medals.  His most notable work is the reverse design of the 2007 American Platinum Eagle.  
Cleveland’s full United States Mint Coin Design Credits are:
 2014 Florence Harding First Spouse Gold Coin Series, Obverse
 2014 Florence Harding First Spouse Gold Coin Series, Reverse
 2013 Meskwaki Nation Code Talker Congressional Gold Medal, Obverse
 2013 Choctaw Nation Code Talker Congressional Gold Medal, Obverse
 2013 Crow Creek Sioux Code Talker Congressional Gold Medal, Obverse
 2013 Crow Creek Sioux Code Talker Congressional Gold Medal, Reverse
 2012 Sacagawea Native American Dollar, Reverse
 2011 Vicksburg Mississippi ATB Quarter, Reverse
 2011 United States Army Half Dollar, Reverse
 2010 Disabled American Veterans Silver Dollar, Reverse & Inscription
 2010 Sacagawea Native American Dollar, Reverse
 2009 Anna Harrison First Spouse Gold Coin Series, Reverse
 2008 Martin Van Buren First Spouse Gold Coin Series, Reverse
 2007 The Platinum American Eagle, Reverse
 2007 Abigail Adams First Spouse Gold Coin, Reverse

References 

Living people
1960 births
Artists from Oklahoma
American artists